Pyaar Zindagi Hai is a 2001 Indian Hindi-language romantic thriller film directed by Vijay Sadanah. It is a remake of the Tamil movie Aasai (1995). It stars Ashima Bhalla, Vikas Kalantri and Mohnish Bahl and was produced by K.C. Bokadia under the banner of BMB Pictures.

Plot

After the marriage of his daughter, Geeta, with army Major Pratap Singh, widower Hridaynath lives a simple middle-class existence with his unmarried daughter, Priya, in Dehra Dun. Geeta, Pratap and their new-born son, Munna, pay them a visit and live with them for a few days. They find out that Hridaynath is under constant threat from a loan shark he had borrowed money from to get Geeta married. Shortly after that Geeta and Pratap leave back home for Ranikhet, and it then that Hridaynath finds out that his loan has been repaid and that they also have a telephone now - thanks to Pratap. Quite unknown to Hridaynath, Pratap has set his eyes on Priya and wants her for himself, so much so that he is willing to kill Geeta and get re-married to Priya on the pretext that Munna needs looking after. So to get the ball rolling, he kills Geeta by drugging and then suffocating her with a polythene bag. He then informs her dad and sister that she has died of a heart attack, and convinces them to leave Dehra Dun and live with him in Ranikhet. This is where he plans to seduce Priya in order to marry her and vows no one can dare to come in his way.

Unfortunately for him, Priya has a fiance Amit that she loves very much and she introduces him to Pratap. Frustrated, Pratap sets out to destroy Amit's character. First, he takes advantage of a careless Sikh man in their way and deliberately arranges for them to bump into him and steals Amit's wallet in the ensuing melee. Predictably when Amit notices his wallet missing, he confronts the Sikh man and makes a fool of himself, as it is Pratap who has the wallet.  When he suspects and attempts to frisk Pratap, Hridaynath chastises him and Pratap escapes. Pratap also tries various means to defame Amit like getting his thugs to beat up Amit and forcibly pouring liquor in his mouth and leaving him looking drunk on the road. Pratap even kills Priya's dog that Amit has gifted.  Finally Amit complains to Pratap's army boss, Lt. Col. Jagat Khanna, who then subsequently catches Pratap nuzzling against Priya's photo lovingly, and realizes that Amit is speaking the truth. He chastises Pratap and asks him to watch it and also casually inquires about Geeta's death.  It is clear that Lt. Col Khanna no longer holds Major Pratap in esteem. Pratap, fearing exposure, kills Khanna with his car during one of his early morning jogs.

Finally, Pratap decides to implement his final move — he frames Amit for drug trafficking and has him arrested. He then consoles the sad Hridaynath and smoothly weaves in his request to marry Priya to care for his child. Disappointed with Amit and impressed with what he sees as a loving son-in-law, Hridaynath readily agrees, to Pratap's glee! Pratap then visits Amit in prison and boasts about his dastardly plan to destroy Amit, seduce and marry Priya and its successful conclusion culminating in Hridaynath's blessing. Simultaneously, Hridaynath and Priya discover the dead Geeta's letter warning about Pratap's lust for Priya and fear of her life. Hridaynath also discovers Pratap's diary which lays out the plot entirely. They try to leave, but Pratap returns, notices the letter and diary in open view and knocks Hridaynath unconscious when he confronts him. He tries to sexually assault Priya, but Amit who escaped from prison rescues her and beats Pratap unconscious. When Pratap awakes, Hridaynath has filled the room with explosive propane gas and threatens to blow them both up with a match, unless Pratap suffocates himself to death exactly as he did to Geeeta, with a polythene bag and string that Hridaynath has provided.  Pratap pleading pathetically fails to move Hridaynath and puts the bag over his own head and ties the string around his neck tight. Unable to bear the suffocation, he rips the bag off, when Hridaynath lights the match and detonates a deadly blast, killing them both.

The movie ends with police releasing and apologizing to Amit and him reuniting with Priya after this horrific family tragedy.

Cast
 Ashima Bhalla as Priya Vashisht
 Vikas Kalantri as Amit Birla
 Mohnish Bahl as Major Pratap Singh, the main antagonist
 Rajesh Khanna as Hridaynath
 Asawari Joshi as Geeta P. Singh
 Upasna Singh as folk singer 
 Shahbaz Khan as Lt. Col. Jagat Khanna
 Azad Khatri

Soundtrack

Release and reception
Pyaar Zindagi Hai opened in theatres on 7 September 2001. It grossed over ₹1,100,000  (US$16,929 dollars) worldwide. The film collected  in the opening week. Taran Adarsh wrote, "The only saving grace of the enterprise is the twist in its story [...] Otherwise, the story meanders on the beaten path, which doesn't excite the viewer one bit."

References

External links
 
 
 

2001 films
Indian romantic thriller films
2000s Hindi-language films
2000s romantic thriller films
Hindi remakes of Tamil films
Indian thriller drama films
2001 thriller drama films